Naksha ( Map) is a 2006 Indian Hindi-language action-adventure film directed by Sachin Bajaj and stars Sunny Deol, Vivek Oberoi, Sameera Reddy and Jackie Shroff. Released theatrically on 8 September 2006, the film was a commercial failure.

Plot
Youngster Vicky Malhotra (Vivek Oberoi) lives with his mother (Navni Parihar). A lawyer shows up to speak with his mother about her late husband's old bungalow in the Uttarakhand hills. Vicky arrives at the bungalow and discovers a secret cache behind one of the photographs. And in the cache lies a replica of a map, made by his father who was once killed unlocking a mystery of treasure.  Eventually, some of his father's murderers discover Vicky, and abduct him. In the meantime, Vicky's mother visits her husband's first wife (Suhasini Mulay). Her husband's son by this wife, Veer Malhotra (Sunny Deol), is a forest officer in Uttarakhand. Veer is Vicky's step-brother. Vicky's mother requests Veer's mother to seek Veer's assistance in finding Vicky and bringing him back. At the same time, the thugs bring Vicky to Bali. As Bali is about to have Vicky executed, Veer drops in and rescues Vicky.
Determined to obtain the map at any cost, Bali's men give chase to Veer and Vicky: the pursuit takes them through the dense jungles of Uttarakhand to the foothills of the Himalayas. They rescue Riya (Sameera Reddy) from a river rafting accident. Bali and his men capture Veer and Vicky, and slaughter the pygmies. Bali reveals that the map describes the location of a powerful device: the armour and earrings of the historical warrior Karna (of the Mahabharata). This armour will make the wearer invincible and all-powerful. Veer and Vicky escape. They arrive at the final destination, only to find that Bali has beaten them to it. Endowed with divine strength, the evil Bali easily overpowers them and prepares to kill them. Veer and Vicky exploit the flaw (that the armour needs sunlight for its powers, which are lost at sunset. Based on the historical fact that the sun God is the father of Karna) to defeat Bali and restore the armour. They escape the temple just in time before it comes crashing down, thus sealing it off forever.

Cast
Sunny Deol as Veer K.Malhotra 
Vivek Oberoi as Vicky K.Malhotra
Sameera Reddy as Riya
Jackie Shroff as Baali
Navni Parihar as Vicky's mother.

Soundtrack

The music was composed by Pritam. The lyrics were written by Sameer apart from the song "U n I", which was penned by Mayur Puri. The album consisting of 11 tracks was released by Saregama on 24 July 2006.

.

References

External links
 
 Official website

2006 films
2000s Hindi-language films
Films featuring songs by Pritam
2000s fantasy action films
Indian fantasy adventure films
Treasure hunt films
Indian fantasy action films
Indian action adventure films
Films based on the Mahabharata
Hindu mythology in popular culture
2000s action adventure films
2000s fantasy adventure films
2006 directorial debut films
Films set in Uttarakhand